Ludwig Edelstein (23 April 1902 – 16 August 1965) was a classical scholar and historian of medicine.

Personal life and career
Edelstein was born in Berlin, Germany, to Isidor and Mathilde Adler Edelstein. He attended the University of Berlin from 1921 to 1924 and received his Ph.D. at the University of Heidelberg in 1929. He was married to Emma J. Levy on 25 Oct. 1928.

Because he and his wife were Jewish, Edelstein lost his academic position and had to flee from Germany in 1933 when the Nazis came to power. Upon his arrival in the US in 1934, he took up an appointment at Johns Hopkins University. Subsequently, he taught at the University of Washington and the University of California at Berkeley, from which he resigned rather than sign the Levering Act loyalty oath. He then returned to Johns Hopkins, where he had appointments at the university in Philosophy and at the School of Medicine in History of Medicine. At the university he taught ancient Greek philosophy in undergraduate and graduate seminars and courses.

Edelstein's 1943 translation and commentary on the Hippocratic Oath was influential on contemporary thinking about medical ethics. He was an inspiring and beloved teacher. Several of his Hopkins students became accomplished scholars. He retired from Hopkins and spent his last years at New York's Rockefeller institution when it transformed from being a medical research institute into being a science university. He was elected to the American Philosophical Society in 1954.

Works
 The Hippocratic Oath: Text, Translation, Interpretation (1943)
 Asclepius: Collection and Interpretation of the Testimonies (1945) with Emma J. Edelstein
 Wielands "Abderiten" und der Deutsche Humanismus (1950)
 Plato's Seventh Letter (1966)
 The Idea of Progress in Classical Antiquity (1967)
 The Meaning of Stoicism (1968) Martin Classical Lectures Volume XXI
 Ancient Medicine: Selected Papers of Ludwig Edelstein (1967) edited by  Owsei Temkin and C. Lilian Temkin
 Posidonius: Volume I: The Fragments (1972) editor with Ian G. Kidd

See also
Harold F. Cherniss, historian of ancient philosophy, friend and colleague of Edelstein

References

External links
 
 Oral history interview transcript with Ludwig Edelstein on 7 May 1962, American Institute of Physics, Niels Bohr Library & Archives
 Obituary by Malcolm L. Peterson 
 

1902 births
1965 deaths
Writers from Berlin
German Ashkenazi Jews
Jewish emigrants from Nazi Germany to the United States
People who lost German citizenship
People with acquired American citizenship
American people of German-Jewish descent
American classical scholars
American medical historians
American scholars of ancient Greek philosophy
Classical scholars of Johns Hopkins University
20th-century American historians
American male non-fiction writers
20th-century American male writers

Members of the American Philosophical Society